Ethiosciapus is a genus of flies in the family Dolichopodidae.

Species
 Ethiosciapus bicalcaratus (Parent, 1933)
 Ethiosciapus exarmatus (Parent, 1933)
 Ethiosciapus finitimus (Parent, 1939)
 Ethiosciapus flavirostris (Loew, 1858)
 Ethiosciapus inflexus (Becker, 1923)
 Ethiosciapus latipes (Parent, 1929)

Species that are now synonyms:
 Ethiosciapus bilobatus (Lamb, 1922): synonym of Ethiosciapus flavirostris (Loew, 1858)
 Ethiosciapus dilectus (Parent, 1935): synonym of Ethiosciapus inflexus (Becker, 1923)
 Ethiosciapus integer (Becker, 1923): synonym of Ethiosciapus flavirostris (Loew, 1858)

References 

Dolichopodidae genera
Sciapodinae
Diptera of Africa